See Elm Creek (Rio Grande tributary) for the tributary of the Rio Grande, in Maverick County, Texas.

Elm Creek is one of two streams of that name in Kinney County, Texas, and Maverick County, Texas.  Elm Creek, considered by some as the upper part of Chacon Creek, with its mouth at the conjunction with Salado Creek, at the head of Chacon Creek, is a tributary of the Nueces River.  Its source is in Kinney County, Texas, in the Texas Hill Country northeast of Brackettville.

References

Tributaries of the Nueces River
Bodies of water of Maverick County, Texas
Rivers of Kinney County, Texas
San Antonio–El Paso Road